Adrian Durant (born October 16, 1984) is the head coach for the Cornell University Men’s Cross Country and Track and Field teams.

An Olympian and former world-class sprinter Durant and now specializes in coaching the sprints, hurdling events, and relays.

Durant served as head coach for the U.S. Virgin Islands track and field team at the 2016 Olympic Games.  He also coached Cornell alumnus, Spanish National record holder, European Champion, and Olympic team member Bruno Hortelano who suffered a “catastrophic hand injury” in a drunk driving accident following the Rio Olympics.

Prior to Cornell Durant was a member the coaching staff of the Florida A&M Rattlers where he primarily coached jumps and sprints.

Coaching career 
In his first year at Cornell Durant’s athletes achieved were responsible for 68 of the Big Red’s points at the Outdoor Ivy League Heptagonal Championship.  Durant led the men’s 4x100m relay to the NCAA Championship with a time of 39.85, the fastest time in the Ivy League since 1978.

As Assistant Coach in 2014, Durant helped lead the Men’s 4x100 and 4x400 relay teams to Ivy League Outdoor Heptagonal Titles. Durant’s athletes scored 79 of the Big Red’s 148.99 points to capture the Outdoor Heptagonal Championship.

At the 2015 Outdoor Heptagonal Championship, Durant’s athletes once again dominated the relay events claiming victory in both the 4x100m and 4x400m.  His sprinters and hurdlers picked up 60 of the Big Reds points in a very close and competitive meet.

During Durant’s first year as head coach, his team won the 2016 Outdoor Ivy League Heptagonal Championship title with a record point score of 211.00 points - the only team in conference history to score over 200 points in a single championship.

In the 2016-17 year, Durant coached his team to a 2nd place finish at both the Indoor and the Outdoor Heptagonal Championships and ranked as the top team in the Northeast Region.

Before coming to Cornell, Durant was part of the coaching staff at Florida A&M University, where he coached All-American and MEAC Champions Leon Hunt (Long Jump) and Stephen Emere (Triple Jump).

Durant continues to work alongside former Cornell Head Coach Coach Nathan Taylor as a member of the U.S. Virgin Islands Track & Field Federation.

Coaching achievements 
 2016 Outdoor Ivy League Heptagonal Championship 
 2016 Northeast Region Men’s Coach of the Year
 2015-2016 Ivy League Men’s Outdoor Coach of the Year
 2017 Northeast Region Men’s Coach of the Year
 Coached Bruno Hortelano European Champion in the 200m, Spanish National record holder in the 100m(10.06) and 200m (20.12) and 10th place overall at the 2016 Olympic Games
 Coached 4 Heptagonal Championship teams 
 Coached 21 Ivy League Heptagonal individual Champions 
 11 Heptagonal relay titles6 Ivy League MVPs
 5 Ivy League Records
 15 NCAA All-Americans

Early life 
Born in Christiansted, St. Croix, U.S. Virgin Islands, Adrian was an athlete and captain of the United States Virgin National Team. He holds both junior and senior records in the US. Virgin Island national team.

Durant’s collegiate career began at University of South Carolina Gamecocks (2003-2007) where he earned All-American Status on the 4x400m relay team (2003) and ran the opening leg of the 4x400m relay team that finished 1st at the 2003 SEC Championships with a time of 3:04.66.

Durant also earned multiple All-Regional and Academic All-Conference Honors and made several appearances at NCAA Championship with personal bests of 10.37 in the 100m, 20.83 in the 200m and 6.69* in the 60m dashes.

International competitions

References

1984 births
Living people
United States Virgin Islands male sprinters
Olympic track and field athletes of the United States Virgin Islands
Athletes (track and field) at the 2004 Summer Olympics
Pan American Games competitors for the United States Virgin Islands
Athletes (track and field) at the 2003 Pan American Games
Athletes (track and field) at the 2011 Pan American Games
South Carolina Gamecocks men's track and field athletes
Cornell Big Red track and field coaches
Florida A&M Rattlers and Lady Rattlers track and field coaches